Munkedals IF is a Swedish football club located in Munkedal in Västra Götaland County.

Background
Munkedals Idrottsförening were formed in 1908. Two famous players that have represented the club are the goalkeepers Dick Last and Magnus Kihlstedt.

Since their foundation Munkedals IF has participated mainly in the middle and lower divisions of the Swedish football league system.  The club currently plays in Division 5 Bohuslän/Dal which is the seventh tier of Swedish football. They play their home matches at the Munkedals IP in Munkedal.

Munkedals IF are affiliated to the Bohusläns Fotbollförbund.

Season to season

In their early history Munkedals IF competed in the following divisions:

In recent seasons Munkedals IF have competed in the following divisions:

Attendances

In recent seasons Munkedals IF have had the following average attendances:

Footnotes

External links
 Munkedals IF – Official website

Football clubs in Västra Götaland County
Association football clubs established in 1908
1908 establishments in Sweden